Twin City, the biggest regeneration project in Central Europe started in Bratislava in 2011. Its goal is to build a multifunctional complex (culture, entertainment, commercial, business, residence, accommodation and transport). Twin City is located at the border of the Old Town and Ružinov districts. The cost of the investment is approximately 17 billion Slovak koruna (about € 500 million).

A 22-floor high-rise building will be the dominant object of the complex (92 metres in height). The original study assumed 42 floors and 170 metres in height but the change was incorporated after public negotiations. A new central bus station will be a part of the complex.

The investment is expected to be completed by 2019.

References 

Buildings and structures in Bratislava